Megan Ann Ganz (born June 1, 1984) is an American comedy writer and former associate editor of The Onion. She has been a writer and executive producer on the FXX series It's Always Sunny in Philadelphia since 2017. She previously wrote for the NBC series Community for three years from 2010 to 2013, and left to write for Modern Family from 2013 to 2015. She also wrote for the Fox comedy series The Last Man on Earth, and co-created the Apple TV+ comedy series Mythic Quest alongside Rob McElhenney and Charlie Day.

Early life and education
Ganz was born in Ann Arbor, Michigan. She was born at 4:20. In 2002 she graduated from Hackett Catholic Central High School in Kalamazoo, Michigan.

In 2006, she graduated with honors from the University of Michigan, where she was editor-in-chief of The Every Three Weekly.

Career
After completing her junior year at the university, she interned at Mad magazine in New York City. Ganz had planned to move back to Michigan after her internship was over, but Mads editor-in-chief John Ficarra encouraged her to remain in New York and pursue comedy writing. She returned to New York and became assistant editor at The Onion and was later promoted to associate editor.

In 2008 Ganz was featured on an episode of This American Life along with other Onion staff members. An agent from United Talent Agency heard the broadcast and suggested that she move into television writing. In summer 2009 Ganz left her job at The Onion and moved to Los Angeles to become a writer for the Comedy Central sketch show Important Things with Demetri Martin.

In 2010, she began writing for the NBC comedy series Community. In 2013, after the shortened season 4 of Community had wrapped, Ganz joined the writing staff of the ABC series Modern Family. In 2015, Ganz created and produced an animated action-comedy pilot called Cassius and Clay which was expected to be paired with Archer on FXX, but the show never progressed beyond the pilot stage.

In 2016, Ganz announced on her Instagram that she had been hired as a writer for It's Always Sunny in Philadelphia, where she has since been promoted to executive producer.

In 2019, Apple TV+ announced Ganz as co-creator, along with Rob McElhenney and Charlie Day, of the new comedy series Mythic Quest, which premiered February 7, 2020 on the streaming platform.

Ganz cites Dave Barry, Kaitlin Olson, Louis Sachar, Mad, Charles Schulz, and Bill Watterson as influences.

Personal life
Ganz began dating British comedian Humphrey Ker in 2013. The couple were engaged in late 2014, and married on May 30, 2015.

In 2018, during a Twitter exchange with Community creator and executive producer Dan Harmon, Ganz accused Harmon of having engaged in inappropriate behavior toward her during their time on the show together. Harmon detailed his behavior on an episode of his podcast, Harmontown, in which he went into detail about his wrongdoings which included making advances on her and then mistreating her after she turned him down. Ganz said that she felt vindicated by the admission and accepted his apology, urging her Twitter followers to listen to this episode of Harmontown, and calling it a "master class in how to apologize", ultimately forgiving him. The exchange, the apology and Ganz's thoughts about them were covered in episode 674 of This American Life in which she was interviewed.

Filmography
The following is a partial list of television episodes written or directed by Ganz.

Community

2.08 "Cooperative Calligraphy" (writer)
2.15 "Intermediate Documentary Filmmaking" (writer)
3.08 "Documentary Filmmaking: Redux" (writer)
3.17 "Basic Lupine Urology" (writer)
4.02 "Paranormal Parentage" (writer)
4.13 "Advanced Introduction to Finality" (writer)

Modern Family

5.09 "The Big Game" (writer)
5.17 "Other People's Children" (writer)
5.19 "A Hard Jay's Night" (co-writer)
5.24 "The Wedding (Part 2)" (co-writer)
6.02 "Do Not Push" (writer)
6.16 "Connection Lost" (co-writer)
6.23 "Crying Out Loud" (co-writer)

It's Always Sunny In Philadelphia

12.08 "The Gang Tends Bar" (writer)
13.02 "The Gang Escapes" (writer)
13.04 "Time's Up for the Gang" (writer)
14.03 "Dee Day" (writer)
14.06 "The Janitor Always Mops Twice" (writer)
15.05 "The Gang Goes to Ireland" (director)
15.06 "The Gang's Still in Ireland" (director)
15.08 "The Gang Carries a Corpse Up a Mountain" (writer)

The Last Man on Earth

4.02 "Stocko Syndome" (co-writer)
4.08 "Not Appropriate for Miners" (co-writer)
4.13 "Release the Hounds" (writer)

Mythic Quest

1.01 "Pilot" (co-writer)
1.03 "Dinner Party” (writer)
1.08 "Brendan" (writer)
1.09 "Blood Ocean" (co-writer)
1.10 "Quarantine" (co-writer)
2.01 "Titans' Rift" (co-writer)
2.02 "Grouchy Goat" (co-writer)
2.05 "Please Sign Here" (director)
2.08 "Juice Box" (co-writer)
3.01 "Across the Universe" (co-writer)
3.02 "Partners" (co-writer)
3.07 "Sarian" (director)

Awards and nominations 
Ganz has been nominated for the Primetime Emmy Award for Outstanding Comedy Series for Modern Family twice, winning in 2014, and nominated in 2015.

References

External links
 
 
 This American Life episode featuring Megan Ganz
 Megan Ganz Reddit Questionnaire (January 7, 2012)

1984 births
Living people
American comedy writers
American women screenwriters
American television writers
The Onion people
University of Michigan alumni
American women television writers
Writers from Kalamazoo, Michigan
Screenwriters from Michigan
21st-century American women writers
Writers from Ann Arbor, Michigan
21st-century American screenwriters